Panjabari is a locality in Guwahati, Assam, India.

Located south east of Guwahati, it is sparsely populated area of the city. Surrounded by hills on all sides except the northern, it preserves its natural scenery, though it is going towards deforestation due to population pressure.
The cultural museum of North Eastern tribes, Shankardev Kalakshetra, is located in Panjabari.

See also

 Bhetapara
 Beltola
 Chandmari
 Ganeshguri

References

Neighbourhoods in Guwahati